This is a list of taxa comprising the flora of the Antipodes Islands.  It includes some species known as megaherbs.

Algae
In 1985, 116 species of marine algae were recorded at the Antipodes Islands. At least three species of freshwater algae have been recorded, but these have not yet been positively identified: a species of Chlorella, at least one species of Chlamydomonas, and a Xanthophyceae, perhaps Tetrakenton or Goniochloris.

Fungi
The only fungi recorded from the Antipodes Islands are Puccinia caricina and a Claviceps (Ergot) species.

Lichens
The following species of lichen have been recorded from the Antipodes Islands:
 Cladia aggregata
 Cladia retipora
 Cladina confusa
 Cladonia campbelliana
 Cladonia capitellata
 Cladonia cervicornis subsp. verticillata
 Everniastrum sorocheilum
 Menegazzia circumsorediata
 Opegrapha diaphoriza
 Parmelia cunninghamii
 Pseudocyphellaria coronata
 Pseudocyphellaria glabra
 Stereocaulon argus
 Stereocaulon ramulosum
 Usnea torulosa
 Usnea cf. xanthopoga
 Xanthoria ligulata

Liverworts
The following species of liverwort have been recorded from the Antipodes Islands:
 Adelanthus occlusus
 Anastrophyllum schismoides
 Chandonanthus squarrosus
 Chiloscyphus erraticus
 Chiloscyphus furcistipulus
 Chiloscyphus physanthus
 Clasmatocolea paucistipula
 Cuspidatula monodon
 Frullania falciloba
 Frullania scandens
 Gackstroemia weindorferi
 Jamesoniella colorata
 Lejeunea primordialis
 Lepidolaena hodgsoniae
 Lepidolaena taylori
 Lepidozia glaucophylla
 Lophocolea bidentata
 Lophocolea hodgsoniae
 Lophocolea gunniana
 Lophocolea minor
 Lophocolea nova-zelandiae
 Lophocolea semiteres
 Lophocolea sp.
 Marchantia berteroana
 Marsupidium abbreviatum
 Metzgeria decipiens
 Metzgeria disciformis
 Pallavicinia xiphoides
 Plagiochila deltoidea
 Plagiochila radiculosa
 Plagiochila sinclairii
 Plagiochila strombifolia
 Porella elegantula
 Telaranea corticola
 Telaranea patentissima
 Tylimanthus tenellus

Mosses
The following species of moss have been recorded from the Antipodes Islands:
 Breutelia pendula
 Bryum argenteum
 Bryum blandum
 Campylopus clavatus
 Campylopus introflexus
 Ceratodon purpureus
 Dicranoloma robustum
 Drepanocladus fluitans
 Lembophyllum clandestinum
 Leptostomum inclinans
 Muelleriella crassifolia
 Pohlia wahlenbergii
 Polytrichadelphus magellanicus
 Polytrichum juniperinum
 Ptychomnion aciculare
 Racomitrium crispulum
 Rhynchostegium tenuifolium
 Sphagnum australe
 Sphagnum falcatulum
 Tayloria purpurascens
 Willia calobolax

Lycopods
Three species of lycopod have been recorded from the Antipodes Islands:
 Lycopodium fastigiatum
 Lycopodium scariosum
 Lycopodium varium

Ferns
The following species of fern have been recorded from the Antipodes Islands:
 Asplenium obtusatum
 Asplenium terrestre
 Austroblechnum durum
 Blechnum fluviatile
 Blechnum penna-marina
 Blechnum sp.
 Grammitis billartierei
 Grammitis magellanica subsp. magellanica
 Grammitis givenii
 Histiopteris incisa
 Hymenophyllum flabellatum
 Hymenophyllum minimum
 Hymenophyllum multifidum
 Hypolepis millefolium
 Phymatosorus diversifolius
 Polystichum vestitum
 Pteridium esculentum

Flowering plants

Monocotyledons
The following species of monocotyledon have been recorded from the Antipodes Islands:
 Agrostis magellanica
 Aporostylis bifolia
 Carex appressa
 Carex sectoides
 Carex ternaria
 Carex trifida
 Chiloglottis cornuta
 Corybas trilobis
 Isolepis aucklandica
 Isolepis cernua
 Juncus scheuchzerioides
 Lachnogrostis leptostachys
 Luzula crinita var. crinita
 Poa annua 
 Poa antipoda
 Poa breviglumis
 Poa foliosa
 Poa litorosa
 Prasophyllum colensoi
 Puccinellia antipoda
 Uncinia hookeri

Dicotyledons
The following species of dicotyledon have been recorded from the Antipodes Islands:
 Anisotome antipoda
 Apium prostratum
 Stilbocarpa polaris
 Helichrysum bellidioides
 Lagenifera petiolata
 Leptinella plumosa
 Pleurophyllum criniferum
 Pseudognaphalium luteoalbum
 Senecio radiolatus
 Sonchus asper
 Taraxacum magellanicum
 Cardamine corymbosa
 Lepidium oleraceum
 Callitriche antarctica
 Colobanthus apetalus
 Colobanthus muscoides
 Stellaria decipiens var. decipiens
 Stellaria decipiens var. angustata
 Stellaria media
 Crassula moschata
 Gentiana antipoda
 Geranium microphyllum
 Pratia arenaria
 Epilobium alsinoides subsp. atriplicifolium
 Epilobium pedunculare
 Rumex neglectus
 Montia fontana
 Acaena minor var. antarctica
 Coprosma ciliata
 Coprosma perpusilla subsp. subantarctica
 Coprosma rugosa
 Coprosma rugosa x ciliata
 Urtica australis

References
 

 
Lists of plants